The 1968 Oregon Webfoots football team represented the University of Oregon during the 1968 NCAA University Division football season. All five home games were played on campus in Eugene at Autzen Stadium, which opened the previous year.

Under second-year head coach Jerry Frei, the Ducks were 4–6 overall and 2–4 in the Pacific-8 Conference. Oregon did not play UCLA for the tenth consecutive season, but tormented top-ranked USC deep into the fourth quarter; a late touchdown broke a tie and the Trojans escaped with a  win at Autzen in early 

It was USC's first-ever trip to Eugene; previous games had been at Multnomah Stadium in Portland, last in 1958. Senior running back O. J. Simpson rushed for 980 yards in the Trojans' first five games  but the Ducks held him to just 67 yards on 25 carries. He had been similarly contained by Oregon the previous year in Los Angeles. Simpson won the Heisman Trophy later in the month and was the first overall pick in the 1969 NFL/AFL Draft in late January.

Oregon opened with three losses, evened up at .500 after six, but lost three of the last four. They defeated both Washington schools, but in the season-ending Civil War at Parker Stadium in Corvallis, #16 Oregon State won their fifth straight in the  It was the last in the series played on natural grass, as both schools installed AstroTurf before the

Schedule

Roster

References

Oregon
Oregon Ducks football seasons
Oregon Webfoots football